Affirmation is the fourth studio album by British singer-songwriter Beverley Knight. It was released by Parlophone Records on 28 June 2004 in the United Kingdom. The album peaked at number 11 on the UK Albums Chart, while reaching number 83 in Switzerland. Affirmation was certified silver by the British Phonographic Industry (BPI) on 2 July 2004, less than a week after the album was released, and had reached gold staus by December 2004. It features three hit singles, "Come As You Are", "Not Too Late for Love" and "Keep This Fire Burning", which all entered the top 40 of the UK Singles Chart.

Reception

Affirmation received generally mixed to positive reviews. Allmusic editor Jon O'Brien rated the album three and a half stars out of five and remarked that "Affirmation clearly has one eye on dominating the airwaves." He found that "inevitably, with the attempt to cover several bases, [it] may alienate fans of her more soulful first two records [...] But overall, there are enough gems on here to suggest that Affirmation may achieve the commercial success it so obviously craves."

Track listing

Main personnel
Beverley Knight – vocals, production, backing vocals, producer, piano
Guy Chambers – piano, keyboards, production, bass guitar, arrangement, organ, synthesizer, clavinet, acoustic guitar
Chris Braide – production, keyboards, guitars, backing vocals
Dominic Glover – trumpet
Richard Flack – drum programming, production, arrangement, engineer, mixer
Phil Spalding – electric guitar, bass guitar
Jimmy Hogarth – guitar, production, programming, percussion
Andy Ross – saxophone
Julian Burdock – electric guitar
Sam Dixon – bass guitar
David Nicholson – keyboards, programming, guitar
Jeremy Stacey – drums
Paul Reid – guitar
Frank Ricotti – percussion
Peter John Vettese – drums, guitar, production, programming
Ghost – production
Martin Slattery – piano
Al Di Meola – guitar
Ashley Kingsley – keyboards, electric piano
Paul Stanborough – additional acoustic guitar
DJ Munro – production
Ian Thomas – drums
Billie Godfrey – backing vocals
Bryan Chambers – backing vocals

Charts

Certifications

References

2004 albums
Beverley Knight albums
Albums produced by Ghost (production team)